Ocampo, officially the Municipality of Ocampo (Rinconada Bikol: Banwāan ka Ocampo), is a 1st class municipality in the province of Camarines Sur, Philippines. According to the 2020 census, it has a population of 51,073 people.

History

The municipality of Ocampo traced its existence as the former “Mission de Mabatobato” launched by the Franciscan friars in 1735. The place was named “Mabatobato” because of the presence of huge rocks scattered all over the place believed to have erupted from Mt. Isarog. As a mission, it has four barrios; Ayugan, Tinablanan, Pinit and Moriones.

In the early 1800s, people from neighboring towns began to flock the area to settle and till the vast areas of lands suited for agriculture. The place began to flourish that the people began to dream of transforming the settlement into a new municipality. Cabeza de Barangay Michael Alcantara and Don Jose Barangbang requested and pleaded to the Bishop of Caceres to make the barrio into a town. The request was granted.

In 1917, Mabatobato was annexed to the municipality of Pili to help it recover from the Spanish–American War and for effective governance. By 1922 it was made into a new parish. Baptisms and burials were first recorded that year. The place began to flourish again and influx of immigrants from neighboring towns as well as from Batangas and Tayabas were observed.

After three decades, the leaders and the people of Mabatobato began to clamor for independence and to govern themselves once again. In 1948, during the incumbency of Congressman Sebastian C. Moll, Jr., 2nd District Camarines Sur, the dream to separate had been brewed. President Elpidio Quirino signed Executive Order No. 243 dated 15 July 1949 entitled: “Organizing Certain Barrios of the Municipality of Pili, Camarines Sur, into an Independent Municipality under the name of OCAMPO”.

Mabatobato was renamed in honor of Don Julian Ocampo who was the Governor of Camarines Sur in the 1930s. Upon the appointment and qualification of the first municipal officials, Ocampo has begun to officially exist as an independent municipality on August 10, 1949.

Geography

Barangays
Ocampo is politically subdivided into 25 barangays.

Climate

Demographics

Language 

The Partido variant of Central Bikolano is the primary language spoken in the entire town. Riŋkonāda or Rinconada Bikol is spoken by a minority of the population, along with the Naga variant of Central Bikolano. Tagalog and English are also spoken and understood.

Isarog Agta Language
In 2010, UNESCO released its 3rd world volume of Endangered Languages in the World, where 3 critically endangered languages were in the Philippines. One of these languages in the Isarog Agta language which has an estimated speaker of 5 people in the year 2000. The language was classified as Critically Endangered, meaning the youngest speakers are grandparents and older, and they speak the language partially and infrequently and hardly pass the language to their children and grandchildren anymore. If the remaining 150 people do not pass their native language to the next generation of Isarog Agta people, their indigenous language will be extinct within a period of 1 to 2 decades.

The Isarog Agta people live within the circumference of Mount Isarog, though only 5 of them still know their indigenous language. They are one of the original Negrito settlers in the entire Philippines. They belong to the Aeta people classification, but have distinct language and belief systems unique to their own culture and heritage.

Religion

The religious groups in the locality are: Roman Catholic, Seventh Day Adventist, The Church of Jesus Christ of Latter Day Saints, Jehovah's Witnesses, Iglesia Ni Cristo, Word International Ministries and other groups of Born-Again Christians.

Economy

Commercial establishments include internet shops, bank, pawnshops, hardware stores, groceries, drug stores, eateries, computer shops, bakeries, motorcycle dealers, agri-dealers, gas stations and several ricemills. Various businesses are sprouting.

Local products include palay, corn, root crops, sugarcane, coconut, and vegetables. Livestock and poultry products are also available.

CASURECO IV supplies power requirement in the town.

Tourism

Tourist destinations include the province-owned: Ocampo Deer Farm in Barangay Santa Cruz, Bamboo Farm in Barangay Hanawan and Murokburok Spring in Barangay Gatbo. There's also Tera Mater Resort, the first resort in the town, located in Barangay New Moriones and a newly opened resort in Barangay San Antonio.

Ocampo Deer Farm is situated at an elevated area about four kilometers up in the forests of Mt. Isarog, in Barangay Santa Cruz, the 28-hectare reindeer farm is considered as the original reindeer farm of the Philippines. It was stocked entirely with Australian species such as Blackbuck Antelope, Fallow Deer, Chital Deer, Red Deer and Elk.

The farm was started late in 1996 with only 208 heads of five species from Australia. As of today, the number remains at 220 heads. Its goal was to make the province a supplier of deer meat (venison) which is a delicacy in class restaurants while the hides can be used as material for bags belts and other goods, and the antlers can be extracted for medicinal value.

Pacific Santa's Inc., founded by Santa R-Kayma Klaws, is entering an exclusive management agreement with the provincial government to micro-manage and promote the farm.

The Bicol Strawberry Farm owned by the Libreja family is found in Barangay Pinit.

Fiestas and festivals
The town fiesta of Ocampo is celebrated in the month August in commemoration of the town's patron saint, Saint Bernard Abbot. The only festival at Ocampo is the Tinagba Festival which showcases the locally produced products of the town. It is celebrated annually during the month of August a week before the town fiesta. During this time, various activities are done.

Transportation
The town is the gateway to 4th District of Camarines Sur, and via Hanawan junction, Consocep falls northward and Iriga City southward. Accessible by land transportation, via National Highway going to Lagonoy, Camarines Sur. From Naga City, the easiest way to go to the town is to ride a bus going to Lagonoy from the Naga City Central Bus Terminal and disembark at Ocampo Poblacion bus stop.

Education

Elementary schools 

 Little Blessings Learning Center School

High schools 

Three secondary schools: Ocampo National High School in Barangay San Francisco, Malate-Olos High School in Barangay Cagmanaba and Hanawan High School in Barangay Hanawan.

Vocational Schools 

 Ryden International and IConnect Global are the two TESDA schools offering vocational courses.

Notable personalities

 Bugoy Drilon – Singer under ABS-CBN and Second Star Dreamer of Pinoy Dream Academy Season 2
 Kyline Alcantara (Kyline Nicole Aquino Manga) – Actress under GMA Network

See also
List of renamed cities and municipalities in the Philippines

References

External links

 [ Philippine Standard Geographic Code]
Philippine Census Information
Official Site of the Province of Camarines Sur

Municipalities of Camarines Sur
Metro Naga
Establishments by Philippine executive order